The 2004 NCAA Division I Men's Golf Championships were contested at the 66th annual NCAA-sanctioned golf tournament for determining the individual and team national champions of men's collegiate golf at the Division I level in the United States.

The tournament was held at The Homestead in Hot Springs, Virginia.

California won the team championship, the Golden Bears' first NCAA title.

Ryan Moore, from the University of Nevada Las Vegas, won the individual title.

Qualifying
The NCAA held three regional qualifying tournaments, with the top ten teams from each event qualifying for the national championship.

Individual results

Individual champion
 Ryan Moore, UNLV (267)

Team results

Eliminated after 54 holes

DC = Defending champions
Debut appearance

References

NCAA Men's Golf Championship
Golf in Virginia
NCAA Golf Championship
NCAA Golf Championship
NCAA Golf Championship